Soyuz MS-23 is an uncrewed Russian Soyuz spaceflight that launched from Baikonur on 24 February 2023 to the International Space Station, in order to replace the Soyuz MS spacecraft for landing that the three Soyuz MS-22 crew members launched onboard, with a new spacecraft.

Background
Due to the -diameter hole punctured in the radiator of Soyuz MS-22 due to micro-meteorite impact, there are doubts over the safety of Soyuz MS-22. So, it was planned to return MS-22 uncrewed like Soyuz 32 and MS-23 was launched unmanned like Soyuz 34 as a replacement. As it was launch uncrewed, it carried ~ dry cargo and equipments in its pressurized section, like a Progress MS spacecraft.

Until the replacement MS-23 docks to ISS, SpaceX Crew-5 was considered among the options to return the MS-22 crew, in case of emergency. This is due to the fact that SpaceX originally designed the Crew Dragon to host a crew of seven at a time. Due to these reasons, the International Space Station mission management team decided to move NASA astronaut Francisco Rubio's Soyuz seat liner from the Soyuz MS-22 spacecraft to Dragon Endurance, in order to provide lifeboat capabilities in the event Rubio would need to return to Earth because of an emergency evacuation from the space station. The seat liner was moved on 17 January 2023, with installation and configuration continuing through most of the day, 18 January 2023. The change allowed for increased crew protection by reducing the heat load inside the MS-22 spacecraft for cosmonauts Prokopyev and Petelin in the event of an emergency return to Earth. Alongside SpaceX Crew-6 space capsule is designed to bring back crew serving as a emergency evacuation after Crew-5.

As the MS-23 arrived at the space station on 26 February, Rubio's seat liner was transferred to the new Soyuz on 6 March and the seat liners for Sergey Prokopyev and Dmitry Petelin were moved from MS-22 to MS-23 on 2 March, ahead of their return in the Soyuz.

Crew

Original scenario 
The original three-Russian member crew for this scenario was named in May 2021. American astronaut Loral O'Hara replaced Andrey Fedyaev as a part of the Soyuz-Dragon crew swap system of keeping at least one NASA astronaut and one Roscosmos cosmonaut on each of the crew rotation missions. This ensures both countries have a presence on the station, and the ability to maintain their separate systems if either Soyuz or commercial crew vehicles are grounded for an extended period.

Primary Crew

Backup crew

New scenario 
As Soyuz MS-22 was unable to perform crew return, it will reenter uncrewed like Soyuz 32 and MS-23 was launched empty like Soyuz 34 to return the MS-22 crew. The original crewed mission was delayed and reassigned to the MS-24 mission.

Crew

Undocking and Return
The mission was planned to be undock from ISS in September 2023 but it was advanced to June 2023 to remove external radiator coolant leak concerns like Soyuz MS-22 and Progress MS-21.

References 

Crewed Soyuz missions
Spacecraft launched in 2023
2023 in Russia